Robert Francis McKinney (October 4, 1875 – August 19, 1946) was an American Major League Baseball infielder. He played for the Philadelphia Athletics during the  season.

References

Major League Baseball infielders
Philadelphia Athletics players
Baseball players from Pennsylvania
1875 births
1946 deaths